"Homer the Great" is the twelfth episode of the sixth season of the American animated television series The Simpsons. It originally aired on the Fox network in the United States on January 8, 1995. In the episode, Homer joins an ancient secret society known as the Stonecutters.

The episode was written by John Swartzwelder and directed by Jim Reardon. Patrick Stewart guest stars as "Number One", the leader of the Springfield chapter of the Stonecutters. It features cultural references to Freemasonry and the films Raiders of the Lost Ark and The Last Emperor.

The episode has received universal acclaim from fans and television critics and has been called one of the best episodes of the series by Warren Martyn and Adrian Wood in their book I Can't Believe It's a Bigger and Better Updated Unofficial Simpsons Guide.

The song "We Do" was nominated for a Primetime Emmy Award for Outstanding Original Music and Lyrics.

Plot
After Homer notices that his coworkers Lenny and Carl enjoy special privileges at the Springfield Nuclear Power Plant, he learns they are part of an ancient secret society known as the Stonecutters. To join, one must either be the son of a Stonecutter or save the life of a Stonecutter. While extolling the secret society at the dinner table, Homer discovers that his father is a member and is admitted.

After his initiation, Homer takes great pleasure in the society's secret privileges. During a celebratory dinner with his fellow Stonecutters, he unwittingly destroys their Hallowed Sacred Parchment. He is stripped of his Stonecutter robes and sentenced to walk home naked. Before he leaves, the Stonecutters see that Homer has a birthmark in the shape of their emblem, signifying he is the Chosen One who will lead them to greatness.

Homer is crowned the new leader of the Stonecutters. He soon feels isolated by his power when the other members treat him differently because he is their leader. When Homer asks Lisa for advice, she suggests that he have the Stonecutters perform volunteer work for the community. The Stonecutters resent being made to help other people and form a new society in a Baskin-Robbins called the Ancient Mystic Society of No Homers.

Homer becomes despondent about losing his secret club. Marge consoles him by telling him he is a member of a very selective club: the Simpson family. To initiate Homer, Bart and Lisa paddle his butt.

Production

Although "Homer the Great" was written by John Swartzwelder, the story was suggested by executive producer David Mirkin. Mirkin did not have enough time to write the episode and asked Swartzwelder to do it. Mirkin came up with the idea while driving home from a rewrite early in the morning and listened to a religious radio station where they were talking about Freemasonry. Mirkin decided it would make a great episode, where many people in Springfield were members of a Masonic society and Homer was left on the outside and felt neglected.

The song "We Do" was not included in the original script and was suggested by Matt Groening. It was written by the writers' room, who threw in as many things that annoyed them as they possibly could. It was described as "one of the series' best musical numbers" by Colin Jacobson at DVD Movie Guide, and was later included in the clip show "All Singing, All Dancing".

The episode guest stars Patrick Stewart as Number One. Stewart said, "I think my appearance in The Simpsons and an appearance that I did on Sesame Street—in praise of the letter B—were perhaps the two most distinguished bits of work that I've done in the US." Mirkin has said that Patrick Stewart is "one of the best guest performances" because "he was so committed to [the] character".

Cultural references
The term "Stonecutters" and the organization's symbol are references to Freemasonry. The Stonecutters are in possession of the Ark of the Covenant and when they burn Homer's underwear in it, spirits escape, which is a reference to Raiders of the Lost Ark. When crowned "The Chosen One", Homer, dressed in finery, enters through some curtains, a reference to the 1987 film The Last Emperor. The name of Stewart's character is a reference to his series Star Trek: The Next Generation, which at the time had recently ended its seven-year run, and in which "Number One" is a nickname used by Captain Jean-Luc Picard (portrayed by Stewart) for his first officer William T. Riker (portrayed by Jonathan Frakes).

Reception

Critical reception
Since airing, the episode has received universal acclaim from television critics and is often cited as one of the best episodes of the show.

The authors of the book I Can't Believe It's a Bigger and Better Updated Unofficial Simpsons Guide, Warren Martyn and Adrian Wood, called it "a brilliant crack at freemasonry, with all the secret signs, one-upmanship, rituals and unusual membership rules. Add to this Patrick Stewart's amazing voice and you have one of the better episodes of the series."

TV Squad's Adam Finley said the episode "does a great job of satirizing Freemasons".

Colin Jacobson at DVD Movie Guide said in a review of the sixth season DVD: "I think it peters out a bit as it progresses; the best moments show the influence of the Stonecutters, and the show drags a little toward the end. Nonetheless, it still offers a solid piece of work."

Patrick Enwright of Today listed "Homer the Great" as his third favorite episode, saying, "as a whole [it] is (almost) unsurpassable".

Dave Petruska of the Tucson Citizen listed "Homer the Great" as his favorite episode "because it is such a wonderful satire on fraternal organizations and because of Patrick Stewart's hilarious guest-starring role as 'Number One'." In 2010, Michael Moran of The Times ranked the episode as the fifth best in the show's history.

Total Films Nathan Ditum ranked Stewart's performance as the ninth best guest appearance in the show's history.

John Swartzwelder and Alf Clausen were nominated for the Primetime Emmy Award for Outstanding Original Music and Lyrics for the song "We Do".

Ratings
In its original broadcast, "Homer the Great" finished 1st in the ratings for the week of January 2 to January 8, 1995. The episode was the highest rated show on the Fox network that week.

References

External links

The Simpsons (season 6) episodes
1995 American television episodes
Fiction about cults
Freemasonry in fiction
Television shows written by John Swartzwelder